Idol is a television show on the Polish television network Polsat, based on the popular British show Pop Idol. The show is a contest to determine the best young singer in Poland. It is hosted by Maciej Rock. od 5 Apil 2002. do 18 June 2005. od 15 February 2017. do 17 May 2017.od.  2002-2005  do. 2017  

In the show, people first audition but eventually the performers are narrowed down to 10 finalists, with each contestant performing live. There are four judges (or five) who provide critiques of each competitor's performance.

Viewers have two hours following the broadcast of the show to vote via telephone and SMS for their favorite contestant. On the night's results episode, the contestant with the fewest votes is sent home.

The winners of Idol were Alicja Janosz in season one, Krzysztof Zalewski in season two, Monika Brodka in season three & Maciek Silski in season four.

After a hiatus of 12 years, the show returned for its 5th season in 2017. The winner is Mariusz Dyba.

Judges

Series overview

References

External links
 Official website

 
Music competitions in Poland
Television series by Fremantle (company)
2002 Polish television series debuts
2000s Polish television series
Polsat original programming
Polish television series based on British television series